The 2022 WTA Argentina Open was a professional tennis tournament played on outdoor clay courts. It was the second edition of the tournament which is also part of the 2022 WTA 125 tournaments. It took place at the Buenos Aires Lawn Tennis Club in Buenos Aires, Argentina between 14 and 20 November 2022.

Singles entrants

Seeds

 1 Rankings are as of 7 November 2022.

Other entrants
The following players received wildcards into the singles main draw:
  Chiara Di Genova
  Paula Ormaechea
  Nadia Podoroska
  Solana Sierra

The following players received entry from the qualifying draw:
  Yuki Naito
  Julia Riera
  Diana Shnaider
  Natalija Stevanović

The following players received entry into the main draw as lucky losers:
  Darya Astakhova
  Sára Bejlek
  İpek Öz

Withdrawals
Before the tournament
  Carolina Alves → replaced by  Sára Bejlek
  Gabriela Lee → replaced by  Ekaterine Gorgodze
  Elizabeth Mandlik → replaced by  Irina Bara
  Yuki Naito → replaced by  İpek Öz
  Camila Osorio → replaced by  María Carlé
  Chloé Paquet → replaced by  Brenda Fruhvirtová
  Nuria Párrizas Díaz → replaced by  Marcela Zacarías
  Mayar Sherif → replaced by  Darya Astakhova

Doubles entrants

Seeds 

 1 Rankings as of 7 November 2022.

Other entrants 
The following pair received a wildcard into the doubles main draw:
  Martina Capurro Taborda /  Julia Riera

Champions

Singles

  Panna Udvardy def.  Danka Kovinić 6–4, 6–1

Doubles

  Irina Bara /  Sara Errani def.  Jang Su-jeong /  You Xiaodi 6–1, 7–5

References

External links
 2022 WTA Argentina Open at wtatennis.com
 Official website

2022 WTA 125 tournaments
2022 in Argentine tennis
November 2022 sports events in Argentina